George Alexander Seymour (16 September 1816 – 3 July 1838) was an English first-class cricketer.

The son of The Reverend George Seymour, he was born at Bristol in September 1816. He was educated at Eton College, before going up to King's College, Cambridge. While studying at Cambridge, he played first-class cricket for Cambridge University in 1836 and 1838, making six appearances. Seymour scored 77 runs in his six matches, with a highest score of 20. Seymour died while still studying at Cambridge, passing away from kidney disease at 4pm on 3 July 1838.

References

External links

1816 births
1838 deaths
Cricketers from Bristol
People educated at Eton College
Alumni of King's College, Cambridge
English cricketers
Cambridge University cricketers
Deaths from kidney disease